MacLellan or McLellan may refer to:

People 
MacLellan (surname)
 Clan MacLellan

Places 
 McLellan Galleries, exhibition space in the city of Glasgow, Scotland
 McLellan Stores, twentieth century chain of five and dime stores in the United States
 MacLellan's Castle, located in Kirkcudbright, Scotland
 McLellan, Florida, unincorporated community, United States

See also
 McLelan
 McClellan (disambiguation)
 McClelland, a surname
 

Anglicised Scottish Gaelic-language surnames
Surnames of Ulster-Scottish origin